Binga Airport  is an airport serving the locality of Binga, in the Mongala Province of the Democratic Republic of the Congo.

The runway is just south of the town.

See also

 Transport in the Democratic Republic of the Congo
 List of airports in the Democratic Republic of the Congo

References

External links
 OpenStreetMap - Binga Airport
 FallingRain - Binga Airport
 HERE Maps - Binga
 OurAirports - Binga Airport

Airports in Mongala